Jermaine Couisnard (born November 25, 1998) is an American college basketball player for the Oregon Ducks of the Pac-12 Conference (Pac-12). He previously played for the South Carolina Gamecocks.

Early life and high school career
Couisnard grew up in East Chicago, Indiana and began playing basketball at a young age, receiving the nickname "Little J." He joined the ECG Ballhogs travel basketball team in third grade. Couisnard attended Central High School in East Chicago, where he was coached by Pete Trgovich. East Chicago native and NBA player E'Twaun Moore served as a mentor to Couisnard. As a junior, Couisnard averaged 17.2 points, 6.0 rebounds, and 2.6 assists per game and was selected to the Indiana Junior All Stars North squad. He scored 45 points against Benjamin Bosse High School and 36 points against Indianapolis North Central High School. Couisnard averaged 29.2 points, 4.3 rebounds and 2.1 assists per game as a senior, but missed the Indiana-Kentucky All-Star Games due to a knee injury. He decided to take a postgraduate year at Montverde Academy to improve his academics and receive more recruiting attention. Couisnard averaged 23 points, six rebounds, and seven assists for Montverde, playing against RJ Barrett in practice. On January 27, 2018, he committed to playing college basketball for South Carolina, choosing the Gamecocks over Illinois and Louisville.

College career
Couisnard redshirted his freshman year due to an academic issue. On February 5, 2020, he scored a career-high 28 points in a 84–70 loss to Ole Miss. As a redshirt freshman, Couisnard averaged 12.1 points, 2.8 rebounds and 3.2 assists per game, earning SEC All-Freshman Team honors. He averaged 10.1 points and 3.2 assists per game as a sophomore. Following the season, Couisnard declared for the 2021 NBA draft but did not hire an agent and ultimately returned to South Carolina. He missed a game against Coastal Carolina on December 1, 2021, due to a groin injury. Couisnard also missed several games in December due to an ankle injury. He averaged 12.0 points, 2.5 rebounds and 3.2 assists per game as a junior. Couisnard transferred to Oregon after the season.

Career statistics

College

|-
| style="text-align:left;"| 2018–19
| style="text-align:left;"| South Carolina
| style="text-align:center;" colspan="11"|  Redshirt
|-
| style="text-align:left;"| 2019–20
| style="text-align:left;"| South Carolina
| 30 || 16 || 26.0 || .392 || .290 || .669 || 2.8 || 3.2 || .8 || .1 || 12.1
|-
| style="text-align:left;"| 2020–21
| style="text-align:left;"| South Carolina
| 17 || 14 || 27.0 || .302 || .289 || .580 || 3.0 || 3.2 || 1.3 || .1 || 10.1
|- class="sortbottom"
| style="text-align:center;" colspan="2"| Career
| 47 || 30 || 26.4 || .358 || .290 || .643 || 2.9 || 3.2 || 1.0 || .1 || 11.4

Personal life
Couisnard is the son of Jermaine Couisnard and Raven Merkerson and has two younger sister, Kalani and Maya. His father works as a maintenance repair technician. In October 2020, Couisnard's best friend Andre Carr was shot and killed. In August 2021, his mother was diagnosed with colorectal cancer, and Couisnard contemplated leaving school but was persuaded to return by her.

References

External links
South Carolina Gamecocks bio

1998 births
Living people
American men's basketball players
Basketball players from Indiana
Montverde Academy alumni
Shooting guards
South Carolina Gamecocks men's basketball players
Sportspeople from East Chicago, Indiana